The German torpedo boat TA37 was an  operated by the German Kriegsmarine during the Second World War. The ship was built for the Italian Navy by the shipbuilder CRDA at their Trieste shipyard with the name Gladio in 1943, but was incomplete when Italy surrendered to the Allies in September 1943, and was seized by Nazi Germany. The ship entered service as TA37 in 1944, serving in the Adriatic and Aegean seas and was sunk by British destroyers on 7 October 1944.

Design and construction
The Ariete class was an enlarged derivative of the Italian , intended to defend convoys from Italy to North Africa from attacks by British submarines and surface ships. To give the ships a chance of fighting British cruisers and destroyers, the Arietes had a heavier torpedo armament, sacrificing a  gun and some speed to accommodate this. A total of 42 ships were planned, but only 16 had been laid down by the time of Italy's surrender.

Displacement was  standard and  full load.

Main gun armament was two Oto Melera 100 mm/47 dual-purpose guns, while the planned close-in anti-aircraft battery consisted of two Breda 37 mm cannon and ten 20 mm cannon. Torpedo armament was to be two triple mounts for 450 mm (17.7 in) torpedo tubes. 28 mines could be carried. Owing to supply problems, however, the Arietes did not complete with the intended torpedo and anti-aircraft armament. TA37 completed with five 450 mm torpedo tubes (one triple and one twin mount), and with an anti-aircraft outfit of 14 20 mm cannon. The ship had a crew in German service of 94 officers and enlisted.

Gladio was laid down at Cantieri Riuniti dell'Adriatico (CRDA)'s Trieste shipyard on 9 January 1943 and was launched on 15 June that year. On 8 September 1943, an Armistice between Italy and the Allies was announced, and in response, German forces carried out pre-planned operations to disarm Italian forces, which resulted in ships under construction, like Gladio, being seized and completed by the Germans. Gladio was completed by the Germans as TA37 on 8 January 1944.

Service
TA37 and sister ship  were the first two Arietes building on the Adriatic coast to complete, and were used to escort convoys from Pola to the Aegean. Le Terrible hit Käpitan Diederichsen with gunfire and a torpedo, setting the transport on fire, while Le Malin sank UJ 201 and hit TA37 in the engine room, disabling her. The French then broke off the action, mistaking the R boats for motor torpedo boats. TA 37 was towed back to Pola, while Käpitan Diederichsen sank under tow.

They continued their transfer to the Aegean via the Gulf of Patras and the Corinth Canal. The three escorts were sunk by gunfire from the two British destroyers, with 103 killed aboard TA37, but Zeus escaped.

Notes

References

Publications

External links
 Classe Ariete Marina Militare website

Ariete-class torpedo boats
World War II torpedo boats of Italy
World War II torpedo boats of Germany
1943 ships
Maritime incidents in October 1944